And The Judges Said is a collection of essays by the Scottish writer James Kelman published in 2002.

The book contains a speech given by Kelman during the opening of the Edinburgh Unemployed Workers Centre (now the Autonomous Centre of Edinburgh), a far-left political organisation and social centre based in Edinburgh. At the core of the collection is an extended essay on Franz Kafka.

References

Scottish books
Works by James Kelman
2002 non-fiction books
Essay collections
Secker & Warburg books